Pamanakallur is a village in the Manvi taluk of Raichur district in the Indian state of Karnataka. Pamanakallur is located northwest to Manvi town. Pamanakallur lies on road connecting Raichur and Bagalkot.

Demographics
As of 2001 India census, Pamanakallur had a population of 2,986 with 1,479 males and 1,507 females and 540 Households.

See also

Byagawat
Devadurga
Lingasugur
Manvi
Raichur

References

External links
www.raichur.nic.in

Villages in Raichur district